Allan Hachigian is an American bobsledder who competed from the late 1960s to the early 1980s. He won a bronze medal in the four-man event at the 1969 FIBT World Championships in Lake Placid, New York.

References
Bobsleigh four-man world championship medalists since 1930

American male bobsledders
Living people
Year of birth missing (living people)
Place of birth missing (living people)